In American network television scheduling, a mid-season replacement is a television show that premieres in the second half of the traditional television season, usually between December and May. Mid-season replacements usually take place after a show that was in the fall schedule was canceled or put on hiatus, outside factors such as an actor's family emergency or personal illness led to a delay in the program's debut, a program was deliberately scheduled for mid-season (for example, shows NBC airs on Sunday nights after the NFL season ends, as it only takes up the first half of the television season), or a program had a shortened season for some other reason which resulted in a time slot that needed filling. A few shows in American television history have been perennial mid-season replacements.  For example, American Idol aired from January to May each year from its second season onward, to great ratings success.  CBS put reruns of the first season of Land of the Lost (1974) on its Saturday morning schedule in June 1985 (running to the end of December) and June 1987 (running until the new season began in September).

An older and related concept is the summer replacement, which debuts between May and August, when a network's fall schedule is on hiatus. Summer replacements tend to be lower-profile shows with either low budgets or minimal prospects for renewal.

Notable mid-season replacement shows

Notes

References

Television terminology